Lucy Wright Park is a 4.48 acres park in the town of Waimea.  The park is named after Lucy Wright, a prominent member of the Waimea community and the first native Hawaiian schoolteacher. Lucy Wright Park is on the southeast side of the mouth of the Waimea River.  The Cook Landing Site is accessible from the park.

The park provides a shaded pavilion, comfort station, cold showers and picnic tables.  Camping is permitted at the park.  The ocean water is brackish due to the river mouth situated right next to this park. The park is noted as a good area for surfing.

External links

References

History of Kauai